Waraqah ibn Nawfal ibn Asad ibn Abd-al-Uzza ibn Qusayy Al-Qurashi (Arabic ) was the paternal first cousin of Khadijah bint Khuwaylid, the first wife of Muhammad. He was considered to be a hanif, who practised the pure form of monotheism in pre-Islamic Arabia. Waraqah presumably died in 610 CE, shortly after Muhammad is said to have received his first revelation.

Waraqah and Khadija were also the first cousins of Muhammad: their paternal grandfather Asad ibn Abd-al-Uzza was Muhammad's matrilineal great-great-grandfather. By another reckoning, Waraqah was Muhammad's third cousin: Asad ibn Abd-al-Uzza was a grandson of Muhammad's  patrilineal great-great-great-grandfather Qusai ibn Kilab. Waraqah was the son of a man called Nawfal and his consort—Hind, daughter of Abī Kat̲h̲īr. Waraqah was proposed to marry Khadija, but the marriage never took place.

Waraqah is revered in Islamic tradition for being one of the first hanifs to believe in the prophecy of Muhammad.

Hadith Traditions

Witness to Muhammad 
When told of Muhammad's first revelation (which is understood to be Sura 96:1-5), Waraqah acknowledged his call to prophecy as authentic. Tradition recounts Waraqah saying: "There has come to him the greatest Law that came to Moses; surely he is the prophet of this people". 

Two different narrations from Aisha give these details.

Aisha also said: "The Prophet returned to Khadija while his heart was beating rapidly. She took him to Waraqah bin Naufal who was a Christian convert and used to read the Gospel in Arabic. Waraqah asked (the Prophet), 'What do you see?' When he told him, Waraqah said, 'That is the same angel whom Allah sent to the Prophet Moses. Should I live till you receive the Divine Message, I will support you strongly.'"

Khadija  then accompanied him to her cousin Waraqah bin Naufil bin Asad bin 'Abdul 'Uzza, who, during the Pre-Islamic Period became a Christian and used to write the writing with Hebrew letters. He would write from the Gospel in Hebrew as much as God wished him to write. He was an old man and had lost his eyesight. Khadija said to Waraqah, "Listen to the story of your nephew, O my cousin!" Waraqah asked, "O my nephew! What have you seen?" God's Apostle described whatever he had seen. Waraqah said, "This was the same one who keeps the secrets whom Allah had sent to Moses (Angel Gabriel). I wish I were young and could live up to the time when your people would turn you out." God's Apostle asked, "Will they drive me out?" Waraqah replied in the affirmative and said, "Anyone (man) who came with something similar to what you have brought was treated with hostility; and if I should remain alive till the day when you will be turned out then I would support you strongly." But after a few days Waraqah died and the Divine Inspiration was also paused for a while.

Poems 
Some poems have been reported to be composed by Waraqah for his companion Zayd ibn Amr bin Nufayl.You were altogether on the right path, Ibn Amr;

You have escaped Hell’s burning oven

by serving the one and only God

and abandoning vain idols …

for the mercy of God reaches men

though they be seventy valleys deep below the earth.

Persecution of Bilal
Once in the heat of the day Waraqah passed an open valley, where Umayyah ibn Khalaf was forcing his slave Bilal ibn Rabah to lie with a large rock on his chest until he denied his faith and worshipped Al-Lat and Al-‘Uzzá. Bilal kept insisting, "One, one!" i.e., there was only one God. Waraqah joined, "One, one, by God, Bilal!" He then protested against the abuse, telling Umayyah and his clan: "I swear by God that if you kill him in this way, I will make his tomb a shrine." Umayyah took no notice. 

Ibn Kathir doubts this tradition because the persecution of the Muslims only began several years after Waraqah's death. However, Sprenger points out that Bilal, being ancestrally Abyssinian, was probably a Christian before he was a Muslim, and it is possible that Umayyah was persecuting him for this reason before 610. In that case, the story that Waraqah tried to help his co-coreligionist is likely to be true. On the other hand, there are no sources that identify Bilal as a Christian, on the contrary, he, before becoming a Muslim renounced his idol worship, hinting that Bilal was a polytheist before he converted early on to Islam. Furthermore Bilal was one of the first converts to Islam.

Post-mortal career
Muhammad  said of Waraqah: "Do not slander Waraqah ibn Nawfal, for I have seen that he will have one or two gardens in Paradise."

Khadija told Muhammad  that Waraqah "believed in you, but he died before your advent." 

Muhammad  added: "I saw him in a dream, and upon him were white garments. If he were among the inhabitants of the Fire then he would have been wearing other than that."

References

External links 
A short description of the first revelation and immediate events
Islamic Awareness - Did Waraqah ibn Nawfal teach the Prophet?

6th-century Arabs
Arab Christians
Converts to Christianity
Christianity and Islam
Khadija bint Khuwaylid
Quraysh
Family of Muhammad